ARM Durango (PO-151) is the first of four s in the Mexican Navy. Like other ships of this class, it was designed and built in Mexican dockyards. The ship is armed with a main  gun turret and a helicopter landing pad. The vessel is primarily used for interdiction of drug smuggling. Launched and commissioned on 11 September 2000, Durango is currently in service.

Description
The Durango-class design is based on the s but with a different superstructure. For electrical power, the Durango class are equipped with two 260 kilowatt generators and one 190 kW generator.

The ships mount an Alenia 2 combat data system and Saab EOS 450 optronic director for fire control. They are equipped with air and surface search radar. The Durango class has a complement of 74 including 10 officers with the capability to transport 55 additional personnel. The vessels also mount a helicopter deck over the stern and a hangar and are capable of operating one medium helicopter.

Construction and career
The ship was laid down at ASTIMAR 1 shipyard in Tampico, Tamaulipas on 18 December 1999. The vessel was launched and commissioned into the Mexican Navy on 11 September 2000. On 6 December 2009, Durango, in a joint operation with a United States Coast Guard ship, intercepted four boats  from the Guatemalan – Mexico border in the Pacific Ocean.

In July 2017 Durango took part in the multinational naval exercise UNITAS 2017 off Peru. On 3 August, Durango responded to a distress call by the tuna fishing vessel Conquista near Puerto Chiapas after the fishing vessel's helicopter crashed into the sea. Using the embarked Panther helicopter, Durango evacuated the two downed aircrew to a nearby naval hospital.

In May 2021, two members of the crew tested positive for COVID-19. They were removed from the ship and taken to Guaymas Naval Hospital. The crew were tested after returning to base on 27 April.

Notes

Citations

Sources
 
 
 

2000 ships
Durango-class patrol vessels
Ships built in Mexico